Artis Hicks Jr. (born November 28, 1978) is a former American football guard of the National Football League. He was signed by the Philadelphia Eagles as an undrafted free agent in 2002. He played college football at Memphis.

Hicks has also played for the Minnesota Vikings, Washington Redskins, and Cleveland Browns.

Professional career

Philadelphia Eagles
Hicks signed with the Philadelphia Eagles in April 2002 as an undrafted free agent. He made the active roster for the entire 2002 season. In 2003, Hicks got his first start against the New York Giants.

In April 2004, Hicks signed a multi-year contract extension with the Eagles.  He started at left guard for the 2004 season, including Super Bowl XXXIX in 2005 against the New England Patriots.

Minnesota Vikings
In April 2006, the Eagles traded Hicks to the Minnesota Vikings, where he started at right guard for the Vikings during the 2006 season.

Washington Redskins
On March 6, 2010, Hicks was signed by the Washington Redskins as a free agent. On September 3, 2011, Washington released Hicks to waivers.

Cleveland Browns
Hicks signed with the Cleveland Browns on September 4, 2011.

Miami Dolphins
Hicks signed with the Miami Dolphins on March 15, 2012. He was placed on injured reserve due to a neck injury on September 4.

References

External links
Minnesota Vikings bio

1978 births
Living people
Players of American football from Tennessee
African-American players of American football
American football offensive guards
American football offensive tackles
Memphis Tigers football players
Philadelphia Eagles players
Minnesota Vikings players
Washington Redskins players
Cleveland Browns players
Miami Dolphins players
21st-century African-American sportspeople
20th-century African-American sportspeople